Jeff Farmer may refer to:

 Jeff Farmer (wrestler) (born 1962), professional wrestler best known as The nWo Sting
 Jeff Farmer (footballer) (born 1977), former Australian Rules footballer